Orient Express is a 1934 American pre-Code drama film directed by Paul Martin and starring Heather Angel, Norman Foster and Ralph Morgan. It is based on the 1932 novel Stamboul Train by Graham Greene.

Cast
Heather Angel as Coral Musker  
Norman Foster as Carlton Myatt  
Ralph Morgan as Dr. Richard Czinner  
Herbert Mundin as Herbert Thomas Peters  
Una O'Connor as Mrs. Peters  
Irene Ware as Janet Pardoe  
Dorothy Burgess as Mabel Warren  
Lisa Gora as Anna  
Roy D'Arcy as Josef Grunlich 
Perry Ivins as Major Petrovich  
Frederick Vogeding as Colonel Hartep  
Marc Loebell as Lieutenant Alexitch

References

External links

1934 drama films
American black-and-white films
American drama films
Films directed by Paul Martin
Fox Film films
Films set on the Orient Express
Films based on British novels
Films based on works by Graham Greene
Films scored by Hugo Friedhofer
Films scored by Arthur Lange
Films scored by Samuel Kaylin
1930s English-language films
1930s American films